Marble Man may refer to:
Man of Marble, a 1977 Polish film
Marble Man: Marble Madness II, an unreleased video game
Robert E. Lee or Marble Man (1807–1870), American and Confederate soldier
Marble Man, a character on Mighty Man and Yukk

See also
Kororinpa: Marble Mania, a video game